Grias is a genus of flowering plants in the family Lecythidaceae, described by Linnaeus in 1759. It is native to northwestern South America, Central America, and Jamaica.

They are small to medium-sized trees, growing to 5–15 m tall. The leaves are evergreen, alternate, simple, broad lanceolate, very large, up to 1 m long, with an entire or waved margin. The flowers are creamy white to yellow, with four petals; they are cauliflorous, produced in clusters on the trunk and stouter branches. The fruit is 6–15 cm long, with a fleshy coat; it is edible in several species.

Grias neuberthii extracts show in vitro activity against human cancer cells.

Accepted species

References

External links
Field Museum: Grias photos 
Field Museum Herbarium: Grias photos

 
Ericales genera